Liquid roofing is the process of waterproofing a roof by the application of a specialist hydrophobic liquid roof coating. It can be applied to most roof styles, including flat, pitched, and domed ones.

History

The concept of liquid roofing has existed since the early 1800s when natural bitumen was combined with jute, straw, rag felt, and other man-made materials to provide a waterproofing solution for roofs. In the early 20th century, the manufacture of liquid roof coatings became a commercial activity, with the earliest coatings based on liquefied rubber. The 1960s and 1970s saw the introduction of acrylics, acrylic emulsions, Styrene-butadiene, and unsaturated polyesters, leading to improved quality and durability of the coatings. In 1975, the first water-based elastomeric roof coatings were introduced. In the late 1980s, single-component moisture-cured polyurethane coatings were developed. They remain the basis of the majority of today's cold liquid applied roof coating technologies.

Concept

Liquid roofing involves the application of a monolithic, fully bonded, liquid based coating to a roof. The coating cures to form a rubber-like elastomeric waterproof membrane, capable of stretching and returning to its original shape without damage. Such coating systems are usually reinforced with secondary materials such as glass-reinforced plastic to provide additional tensile strength. The coatings can be applied over most traditional roofing materials, including felt, asphalt, bitumen, and concrete. Liquid spray-applied roofing membranes have been one of the fastest growing roofing systems in North America and Europe.

Benefits

Cost-effectiveness

The process of liquid roofing provides a cost-effective method of making a new or existing roof waterproof because it is estimated 70% less expensive than overall roof replacement for refurbishment.

High performance

Liquid roofing can be undertaken with high performance materials. Many of the products used in the liquid roofing process have been independently tested and their performance verified.

Safety

Unlike the installation of felt, asphalt and bitumen membranes, liquid roofing does not involve hot works. Hot work on roofs is an extremely high-risk process that poses a significant fire risk to contractors as well as to the building and its occupants. The coating material used in the liquid roofing process is applied cold, thus negating any fire risk.

Encapsulation

When applied, liquid roofing systems encapsulate the surface they are applied to, preserving whatever is underneath and protecting it from weathering. This is especially desirable when dealing with asbestos roofs, as attempted removal of asbestos roofing can damage it, releasing material that can trigger asbestosis. Using a liquid coating system instead seals the asbestos, thus making disturbance of the material more difficult.

Easy application 
Application is simplified by fast curing as well as a high resistance to extreme temperatures (between -40 °C and +80 °C). Minimal equipment is needed in installation.

References                        

Roofs